The Cameroun Express is a Cameroonian online newspaper created in July 2009.

References

External links
 

Newspapers published in Cameroon
Publications established in 2009